Michael Cunningham is an American novelist and screenwriter.

Michael or Mike Cunningham may also refer to:

 Michael Cunningham (psychologist), American social psychologist
 Michael R. Cunningham, university administrator
 Michael Cunningham (footballer, born 2001), Scottish footballer
 Michael Cunningham (footballer, born 1991), English footballer
 Mike Cunningham (baseball), American Major League Baseball pitcher
 Mike Cunningham (politician), member of the Missouri Senate
 Mike Cunningham (police officer), British police officer